The Nashville Fire Department provides fire protection and emergency medical services to Nashville, Tennessee.

History
The fire department started in May 1807 as a volunteer fire service and became a paid organization on July 24, 1860 with John S. Dashiell as the first chief. Nashville's first motorized fire engine was put into service in 1912. The department currently has thirty-nine stations. On November 1, 1974, the Emergency Medical Services Division was added. Until that time, the fire department put out fires and ambulances were provided by funeral homes. All firefighters are now cross trained as EMT's and Paramedics.

Stations and apparatus 
Below is a list of the fire stations and apparatus in use by the Nashville Fire Department. 

Director Chiefs

John S. Dashiell             1860-1862

John M. Seabury            1862-63

L.M. Freeman                 1863-Oct 1865, Oct 11,1866- Oct 1867

L.M. Gorby                    Oct 1865- Oct 1866

John Bentley                   Oct 1867- Oct 1869

William Stockell            Oct 1869, 1871–83

Andrew Meaders            1883-March 8, 1884

E.M. Carell                     March 10, 1884–92; Jan 1,1894-1900

J.D. Alexander               1893    

Antonio A. Rozetta        1901-19

Joseph W. Weaver         1920-26

Frank A. Moore              1926-38

Jesse A. Scruggs            1938-44

H.D. Demonbreun         1944-57

John Ragsdale                1957-63

Russell Campbell           1963-65

William C. McIntyre      1965-71

Frank J. Quinn               1971-74

William P. Ackerman    1975-79

Fred G. Davis                 1980-87

Martin M. Coleman        1988-93

Norman “Buck” Dozier  1994-2000

Stephen D. Halford        2001-2012

Richard “Ricky” White  2013- 2017

William Swann                2017–Present

References

Fire departments in Tennessee
Government of Nashville, Tennessee